Zaki Beyg, also rendered as Zaki Beg, may refer to:
 Zaki Beyg-e Olya
 Zaki Beyg-e Sofla